Tschaikovsky Suite No. 3 is a ballet made by New York City Ballet co-founder and founding choreographer George Balanchine to Tschaikovsky's Suite No. 3 for Orchestra in G major, Op. 55 (1884). The premiere  took place on 3 December 1970 at the New York State Theater, Lincoln Center, with scenery and costumes by Nicolas Benois.

Theme and Variations 

Balanchine set the final movement of Tschaikovsky's third orchestra suite in 1947 for Ballet Theatre under the title Theme and Variations. He incorporated this choreography substantially unchanged into Tschaikovsky Suite No. 3 as the fourth–and final–movement, which is sometimes called Tema con variazioni, when he set the entire suite.

Original cast
 Karin von Aroldingen 
 Kay Mazzo 
 Marnee Morris 
 Gelsey Kirkland 
 Anthony Blum 
 Conrad Ludlow 
 John Clifford 
 Edward Villella

Reviews 
 NY Times by Alastair Macaulay, 1 June 2007

External links 
Tschaikovsky Suite No. 3 on the Balanchine Trust website

1970 ballet premieres
Ballets by George Balanchine
Ballets designed by Nicolas Benois
Suite No. 3, Tschaikovsky
New York City Ballet repertory